The Dreamers Guild was a publisher and developer of video games that operated from 1988 until 1997.

History 
Authors Bryan Kritzell and David C. Logan reported that The Dreamers Guild was founded on an "open, consensus-driven" business model, in which employees voted to decide the company's corporate moves. It was based on the model of a guild. The company's art department was run by artist Bradley W. Schenck, who had previously created The Labyrinth of Time at Terra Nova Development. At final count, The Dreamers Guild employed over 100.

Employee Joe Pearce recalled that most of the Dreamers Guild's games were "a mixed bag success-wise." He cited Inherit the Earth: Quest for the Orb as a commercial flop, and called I Have No Mouth, and I Must Scream "a modest seller." Halls of the Dead: Faery Tale Adventure II (1997) was The Dreamers Guild's final game before the company's closure. According to Retro Gamer, the developer "rushed out" the game before its bankruptcy. Pearce noted that "it barely got out the door."

Games 
 Nick of Time – (unreleased)
 Skulls, Bones and Buccaneers – (unreleased)
 Halls of the Dead: Faery Tale Adventure II – 1997
 The Legend of Kyrandia: Malcolm's Revenge (port to Mac OS) – 1996
 Dinotopia Adventure Game for PC – 1996
 I Have No Mouth, and I Must Scream – 1995
 FiefQuest – 1995
 The Labyrinth of Time (port to Mac OS) – 1995
 Inherit the Earth: Quest for the Orb – 1994
 Fast Action Paq – 1994
 Solitaire and Other Card Games – 1994
 Deluxe Music 2.0 – 1993
 The Legend of Kyrandia (port to Mac OS) – 1993
 More Vegas Games – 1993
 A-Train & A-Train Construction Set (port to AmigaOS and Mac OS) – 1993
 Robosport (port to AmigaOS) – 1992
 Faery Tale Adventure – 1990
 Ebonstar – 1988

References

External links 
The Dreamers Guild (Homepage)
A Pictorial Retrospective of the Dreamers Guild

Defunct video game companies of the United States
Video game companies established in 1988
Video game companies disestablished in 1997
Video game development companies
Video game publishers